Linda Randall is a Professor Emerita of Biochemistry and Wurdack Chair Emerita of Biological Chemistry at the University of Missouri. Her research has shown unexpected and complex details of the movement of newly made proteins from the cytosol across membranes into the organelles of the cell.  In particular, she found that the entire protein was kept unfolded by association with a chaperone and not just directed to cross membranes by its terminal leader sequence. In 1997, she was elected to the National Academy of Sciences of the USA because of the excellence of this work.  She has received a number of other honors and awards.

Education 
Randall received her BS from Colorado State University in Zoology and her PhD at the University of Wisconsin in Molecular Biology.

Academic research career 
Randall was a professor at the University of Uppsala for eight years before joining the faculty at Washington State University, WSU, in 1981.  After twenty years at WSU, she moved to the University of Missouri.

Randall's research focuses on the mechanism of protein export in the bacterium Escherichia coli.  Her laboratory demonstrated the role of chaperones in the transport and folding of proteins.

Honors and awards 
National Academy of Sciences, 1997
American Academy of Microbiology
American Academy of Arts and Sciences, 1984
Fellow of the American Association for the Advancement of Science
Eli Lilly Award in Microbiology or Immunology (American Society for Microbiology)

Selected works 
Bariya P, Randall LL. (2018). “Co-assembly of SecYEG and SecA fully restores the properties of the native translocon.” J Bacteriol. 2018 Oct 1. doi: 10.1128 JB.00493-18 Epub ahead of print.
Findik BT, Smith VF, Randall LL. (2018). “Penetration into membrane of amino-terminal region of SecA when associated with SecYEG in active complexes.” Protein Sci. 27(3):681-691. doi: 10.1002/pro.3362.  
Suo Y, Hardy SJS, Randall LL. (2015). “The basis of asymmetry in the SecA:SecB complex.” J Mol Biol. 427(4):887-900. doi: 10.1016/j.jmb.2014.12.008. [PubMed]
Mao C, Cheadle CE, Hardy SJ, Lilly AA, Suo Y, Sanganna Gari RR, King GM, Randall LL. (2013). “Stoichiometry of SecYEG in the active translocase of Escherichia coli varies with precursor species.” Proc Natl Acad Sci U S A. 110(29):11815-20. doi: 10.1073/pnas.1303289110. [PubMed]
Sanganna Gari RR, Frey NC, Mao C, Randall LL, King GM. (2013). “Dynamic structure of the translocon SecYEG in membrane: direct single molecule observations.” J Biol Chem. 288(23):16848-54. doi: 10.1074/jbc.M113.471870. [PubMed]
Suo Y, Hardy SJ, Randall LL. (2011). “Orientation of SecA and SecB in complex, derived from disulfide cross-linking.” J Bacteriol. 193(1):190-6. doi: 10.1128/JB.00975-10. [PubMed]
Randall LL, Henzl MT. (2010). “Direct identification of the site of binding on the chaperone SecB for the amino terminus of the translocon motor SecA.” Protein Sci. 19(6):1173-9. doi: 10.1002/pro.392. [PubMed]
Crane JM, Lilly AA, Randall LL. (2010).  “Characterization of interactions between proteins using site-directed spin labeling and electron paramagnetic resonance spectroscopy.” Methods Mol Biol. 619:173-90. doi: 10.1007/978-1-60327-412-8_11. [PubMed]
Lilly AA, Crane JM, Randall LL. (2009). “Export chaperone SecB uses one surface of interaction for diverse unfolded polypeptide ligands.” Protein Sci. 18(9):1860-8. doi: 10.1002/pro.197. [PubMed]
Randall, L.L. and Hardy, S.J.S.  (1995) “High selectivity with low specificity: how SecB has solved the paradox of chaperone binding.”  Trends in Biochem Sci 20:65-69. DOI:https://doi.org/10.1016/S0968-0004(00)88959-8

References

Living people
American women biochemists
Protein folding
Colorado State University alumni
University of Wisconsin–Madison alumni
University of Missouri faculty
Washington State University faculty
Academic staff of Uppsala University
Year of birth missing (living people)
American women academics
21st-century American women